Chi Kraeng River (Steung Chi Kraeng, also spelled Stoĕng Chi Kreng) is a river in Cambodia. It is a major tributary of the Tonlé Sap. The name means "great ancestor" in Khmer.

References

Rivers of Cambodia
Tonlé Sap